Israelândia is a municipality in eastern Goiás state, Brazil.

Location
Israelândia is located in the Iporá Microregion, 28 km. northeast of regional center Iporá.  State capital Goiânia is 199 km. to the east.  The Rio Claro, a tributary of the Rio Araguaia, flows through the municipality.
Highway connections with Goiânia are made by taking state highway BR-069 west from Goiânia, through Trindade, São Luís de Montes Belos, and  then 31 kilometers northeast to Amorinópolis.  Neighboring municipalities:  Jaupaci, Fazenda Nova, Moiporá, and  Iporá.

Districts, villages, and hamlets
District:  Piloândia

Demographics
Population growth rate 1996/2007:  -1,69%
Population in 1980: 3,583
Population in 2007: 2,827
Urban population in 2007: 2,137
Rural population in 2007: 690 (Sepin)

The economy
The economy is based on services, small industries, cattle raising, and agriculture.  There were 2 industrial establishments and 25 retail establishments in 2007.  The cattle herd had 50,000 head.  The main crops are rice, bananas, manioc, and corn, all in modest planted areas.
GDP (PIB)(R$1,000.00):  17,792 (2005)
GDP per capita (R$1.00):  6,393 (2005)

Motor Vehicles
Automobiles: 132
Pickup trucks: 21
Number of inhabitants per motor vehicle: 18.4

Agricultural data 2006
Farms:  290
Total area:  52,914 ha.
Area of permanent crops: 118 ha.
Area of perennial crops: 742 ha.
Area of natural pasture:  38,152 ha.
Area of woodland and forests:  12,586 ha.
Persons dependent on farming:  1,200
Farms with tractors: 41
Number of tractors:  54
Cattle herd:  50,000 head

Education and Health(2006)
In 2006 there were 3 schools in activity with 788 students.   There was one hospital with 20 beds.  The literacy rate was 84.5% while the infant mortality rate was 24.39 in 1,000 live births.  The score on the Municipal Human Development Index was 0.730.

History
The history of Israelândia begins in 1942 when Fernando Martins Marques discovered gold and diamonds in the Rio Claro.  The first name was Monchão do Vaz when the village became a district of Iporá in 1953.  In 1958 it achieved municipal status and took the name Israelândia, in honor of Israel de Amorim, who fought for its autonomy.

See also
 List of municipalities in Goiás
Microregions of Goiás

References

Frigoletto

Municipalities in Goiás